, known mononymously as Ginji, is a Japanese professional baseball infielder for the Tohoku Rakuten Golden Eagles in Japan's Nippon Professional Baseball.

External links

NPB.com

1988 births
Japanese baseball players
Living people
Nippon Professional Baseball first basemen
Nippon Professional Baseball second basemen
Nippon Professional Baseball third basemen
Baseball people from Iwate Prefecture
Tohoku Rakuten Golden Eagles players